The FIBA Africa Basketball League All-Star Team was a selection of the five best players in the now defunct FIBA Africa Basketball League (ABL) season. Formerly the league was named the FIBA Africa Clubs Champions Cup (ACC).

Eduardo Mingas holds the record for most selections, with five.

Selections

Selections by player

References

FIBA Africa Clubs Champions Cup